Kedungbanteng is a district located in the eastern part of Tegal Regency, Central Java, Indonesia. The Kedungbanteng district is 8 km drive from the center of regency, namely Slawi Town through southern of Pangkah district. The central government is located in the village of Kedungbanteng.

Villages 
There are ten villages in Kedungbanteng, Tegal:
Dukuhjati Wetan
Karanganyar
Karangmalang
Kebandingan
Kedungbanteng
Margamulya
Penujah
Semedo
Sumingkir
Tonggara

Boundaries 
The boundaries of the district of Kedungbanteng, Tegal are as follows :

Tourism 
 Cacaban Lake
Cacaban Lake is one of the tourist attractions in the form of a reservoir or dam in Penujah Village which also serves to irrigate the surrounding fields. For photographers, this place is scenic.  At the tourist sites Tirta Reservoir Cacaban there are a few floating stalls selling a variety of fresh water fish dishes. The view from the floating stalls is also very beautiful and unique.
 Archaeological Site of Semedo
The Semedo site is in the Village of Semedo, Kedungbanteng District, Tegal Regency. The cultural heritage that spans the area of the Perhutani of the Forest Stakeholders Unity (Indonesian : Kesatuan Pemangku Hutan or "KPH") Pemalang was discovered in 2005. At least three important fossils from the Semedo Site are considered to have opened new horizons for prehistoric research. 
The discoverer of the Semedo site was Mr. Dakri, a villager of Semedo who began collecting fossils from Semedo hill (148 m, coordinates ) since 2003. The fossils are lying in full view on the ground, without any digging process required. He collected the fossils one by one and kept them in his house. So his home became a simple museum for the fossils of Semedo. 
Animals such as Mastodon sp. (ancient elephant), Stegodon sp. (ancient elephant), Elephas sp. (ancient elephant), Rhinoceros sp. (rhinoceros), Hippopotamus sp. (hippopotamus), Cervidas (deer species), Suidae (pig species), Bovidae (cow, buffalo, bull), etc. They once lived between 1.2 - 0.4 million years ago in Semedo. Here there are also found ancient human skull fragments of Homo erectus which opened a new horizon about the spread of Homo erectus in Java, according to researchers from the expert team of Conservation Hall of Ancient Human Site Sangiran. The fossil was about 700,000 years old at the time of the middle Pleistocene. In addition to fossils, there are chopping tools, flakes, scrappers, and debris. The type of stone used for tools includes  chert, silicified limestone and chalceneony.

References 

Districts of Central Java